Indian Institute of Technology Palakkad (IIT Palakkad or IIT PKD) is a public autonomous engineering and research institute located in Palakkad, Kerala. It is one of India's 23 IITs. Proposed in the 2014 Union budget of India, IIT Palakkad was established in 2015 as an Institute of National Importance by the Government of India.

The institute started functioning in August 2015 from a temporary site located inside the Ahalia Integrated Campus, Palakkad. In February 2019, academic activities commenced on the Nila Campus, sometimes referred to as the transit campus. The Nila Campus is nestled in the corner of the under-construction 500-acre permanent campus at Kanjikode.

History 
The Indian Institutes of Technology (IITs) were established by the Government of India as Institute of National Importance through a Central Statute, the Institutes of Technology Act, 1961. The success of the IITs led to the demand for establishing more such institutions across our country. Kerala, one of India's most educationally advanced states, had a long pending demand for an IIT. In 2012, then Prime Minister Dr. Manmohan Singh said that the Centre was seriously considering a proposal to set up an IIT in Kerala under the Twelfth Plan.

In July 2014, an IIT in the state of Kerala was proposed in the 2014 Union budget of India. On November 20, 2014, IIT Madras was designated as the mentor institute by the Ministry of Human Resources and Human Development, and the director of IIT Madras, Dr. Bhaskar Ramamurthi assumed the role of Mentor Director. The institute's first academic session commenced on August 3, 2015 with a sanctioned strength of 120 students – 30 each in Civil Engineering, Computer Science Engineering, Electrical Engineering and Mechanical Engineering. IIT Madras deputed a batch of experienced professors including the ones recently retired, former deans and heads of various departments to the new campus as both permanent and visiting professors.

IIT Palakkad was incorporated in the Institutes of Technology Act, 1961, through the Institutes of Technology (Amendment) Act, 2016, in September 2016. In January 2017, Dr. P. B. Sunil Kumar, who was the Professor-in-charge, was appointed as the Director by then President of India, Pranab Mukherjee.

A. Seshadri Sekhar, professor and head of the department of mechanical engineering at the IIT Madras, succeeded Dr. P. B. Sunil Kumar as the director of the institute in October 2022.

Campus and location 

IIT Palakkad currently functions in two campuses - the temporary campus and the Nila campus - which are separated by about 13 km. Both of them have on-campus housing facilities. The temporary campus is situated inside the Ahalia Integrated campus in Kozhippara, Palakkad, which is about 20 km from Palakkad city. The academic block of the temporary campus is 55,000 sq. ft. in area and consists of well-equipped academic classrooms, a seminar room, an auditorium, conference room, workshop, library, cafeteria, laboratories and faculty offices. It also provides hostel and sports and recreational facilities with access to high-speed internet. 

The Nila Campus is set up in 30 acres out of the 504 acres allotted to the permanent campus site in Kanjikode. The campus has an excellent infrastructure in place, which comprises an auditorium, multimedia enabled small and large classrooms, student laboratories, library, canteen, and fully Wi-Fi enabled hostels with mobility in Internet access. The academic space and the laboratory complex are named Samgatha and Manogatha respectively. The students in the Nila Campus are accommodated in the three newly built hostels - Bageshri, Brindavani and Tilang. The construction of phase I of the permanent campus is ongoing.

Academics 

Programmes 

IIT Palakkad currently offers four-year Bachelor of Technology (B.Tech) and two years MS programmes in different engineering disciplines. Similar to the other IITs, admission to undergraduate programmes is based on qualification through the extremely competitive Indian Institute of Technology Joint Entrance Examination (IIT-JEE). In addition to that, Ph.D programme is also offered in all the disciplines of Science and Engineering. It is also offering Master of Technology (M.Tech) in two disciplines from the year 2019 in which candidates having valid GATE (Graduate Aptitude Test in Engineering) scores are eligible to apply. From 2019, M.Sc programmes in Physics and Chemistry will also be offered. The admissions to these programmes are through IIT-JAM.

In 2022, the institute introduced flexible choice based B.Tech programs and degree options alongside a new B.Tech program in Data Science and Engineering. 

IIT Palakkad is currently functioning with 8 disciplines. 
 Civil Engineering
 Computer Science & Engineering
 Electrical Engineering
 Mechanical Engineering
 Chemistry
 Physics
 Mathematics
 Humanities

Grading Scheme 

Each student is awarded a final letter grade at the end of the semester, for each course undertaken. The letter grades and the corresponding grade points are as follows:

See also
 Indian Institutes of Technology
 Indian Institute of Technology Madras
 Indian Institute of Technology Tirupati

References

External links

 Official website

Engineering colleges in Kerala
Palakkad
Universities and colleges in Palakkad district
Educational institutions established in 2015
2015 establishments in Kerala